Diplocalyptis is a genus of moths belonging to the subfamily Tortricinae of the family Tortricidae. They occur in South and East Asia.

Species
There are eight species:
Diplocalyptis apona Diakonoff, 1976
Diplocalyptis congruentana (Kennel, 1901)
Diplocalyptis ferruginimixta Razowski, 2009
Diplocalyptis nigricana (Yasuda, 1975)
Diplocalyptis operosa (Meyrick, 1908)
Diplocalyptis shanpingana Razowski, 2000
Diplocalyptis tennuicula Razowski, 1984
Diplocalyptis triangulifera Razowski, 2009

See also
List of Tortricidae genera

References

 ,2005 World Catalogue of Insects, 5

Archipini
Tortricidae genera
Taxa named by Alexey Diakonoff